Vălișoara (formerly Kőfalu) is a commune in Hunedoara County, Transylvania, Romania. It is composed of four villages: Dealu Mare (Gyalumáre), Săliștioara (Szelistyora), Stoieneasa (Sztojenyásza) and Vălișoara.

References

Communes in Hunedoara County
Localities in Transylvania